The 1994 FIVB World Grand Prix was the second edition of the women's volleyball tournament, annually arranged by FIVB. It was played by eight countries from 19 August to 11 September 1994. The final round was staged in Shanghai.

Preliminary rounds

Ranking
The host China and top three teams in the preliminary round advance to the Final round.

|}

First round

Group A
Venue: Seoul, South Korea

|}

Group B
Venue: Taipei, Taiwan

|}

Group C
Venue: Jakarta, Indonesia

|}

Second round

Group D
Venue: Bangkok, Thailand

|}

Group E
Venue: Tokyo, Japan

|}

Group F
Venue: Macau

|}

Third round

Group G
Venue: Fukuoka, Japan

|}

Group H
Venue: Guangzhou, China

|}

Group I
Venue: Manila, Philippines

|}

Final round
Venue: Shanghai, China

|}

Final ranking

|}

Final standings

Individual awards
Most Valuable Player: 
Best Scorer : 
Best Spiker: 
Best Blocker: 
Best Server: 
Best Setter: 
Best Receiver:

Dream Team
Setter : 

Middle Blockers:

Outside Hitters:

Opposite Spiker:

References
Results

1994
FIVB World Grand Prix
1994 in Chinese sport
International volleyball competitions hosted by China